Sleigh is a surname. At least one (H. C. Sleigh below) is pronounced "slee". Notable people with the surname include:

Arthur B. Sleigh (1821–1869), founder of the British newspaper The Daily Telegraph
Bernard Sleigh (1872–1954), English artist
Dan Sleigh (born 1938), South African novelist
H. C. Sleigh (1867–1933), Australian shipowner and founder of "Golden Fleece" petroleum business
Julian Sleigh (1927–2013), South African Christian Community priest and author
Sylvia Sleigh (born 1935), American realist painter
Tom Sleigh, American poet, dramatist, essayist and academic
Violet Sleigh (born 1935), the first Miss Malaysia, and World War II prisoner of war
William Campbell Sleigh (1818–1887), English lawyer and politician

See also
Sleigher (surname)
Slay (disambiguation)